Global Brands Group Holding Limited is a bankrupt holding company that has its own brand of apparel and footwear, as well as being a brand management company. It designs, develops, markets and sells products under a diverse array of owned and licensed brands in a wide range of product categories. In June 2021, despite a series of asset sales, the company's liabilities still exceeded its asset value. Trading in the shares of the financially stressed entity was halted by the Hong Kong Stock Exchange due to its inability to file annual results. In 2022 Creative Artists Agency took full ownership of the joint venture, CAA-GBG Global Brand Management Group (CAA-GBG), a partnership that was launched in 2016. CAA-GBG works with brand owners, retailers, and manufacturing partners to engage new consumers by extending brands into new geographies and product categories. Through this brand management's business , the company manages brands as well as celebrities including David Beckham and Drew Barrymore.

The company works with brands under its four business verticals: Men's and Women's Fashion, Footwear and Accessories, Kids and Brand Management. The products are sold across multiple geographies and through various distribution channels, including department stores, hypermarkets/clubs, off-price retailers, independent chains, and specialty retailers. While Global Brand's business is primarily wholesale, the Group also makes strategic investments in direct-to-consumer retail.

The company designs, develops, markets and sells products under a diverse array of owned and licensed brands, such as Spyder.

Background
The history of Global Brands Group can be traced back to 2005 when Li & Fung Limited established a wholesale business focusing on private label and branded apparel in order to broaden its relationships with existing and new retailer customers. On 4 December 2013, in preparation for the spin-off from Li & Fung and Listing, Global Brands Group was incorporated in Bermuda. On 13 December 2013, it became a wholly owned subsidiary of Li & Fung.

On 9 July 2014, Global Brands Group was listed on the Main Board of the Hong Kong Stock Exchange by way of introduction as a result of a spin-off from Li & Fung. Its business is now separate and independent from Li & Fung's trading and logistics businesses.

On 3 December 2014, Global Brands Group, together with David Beckham announced the launch of a joint venture, Seven Global, to drive the continued development of all consumer product categories around David Beckham.

On 15 June 2016, Global Brands announced a joint venture with Creative Artists Agency for its brand management business called CAA-GBG, which instantly became a global brand management company but post serious financial loss in subsequent years.

On 7 September 2016, Global Brands announced a new joint venture with Katy Perry to grow the Katy Perry brand into new consumer product categories with footwear being the first category to launch.

In October 2018, Bruce Rockowitz stepped down as CEO after the sale of the company’s North American assets to Nasdaq-listed Differential Brands Group at US$1.2 billion. Richard Nixon Darling was appointed CEO and presided over the beginning of the end of the company.

For financial year 2020 the company posted a loss of US$584 million vs a loss of US$388 million in 2019, widening by almost US$200 million. In a mind boggling move, the board has allowed CEO Richard Nixon Darling's remuneration to increase more than 12 fold during this period, from US$516,000 in 2019 to US$6,592,000 in 2020.

On 17 June 2021, the sale of Spyder to a Korean investor netting US$19.5 million was completed but at the same time the company issued a warning to investors over its ability to continue to trade as a going concern.

On 21 July 2021, trading of the shares on the Hong Kong stock exchange after it was unable to submit its year-end results. Its shares were at HKD 0.189 at the time suspension, making for a market capitalization of HKD 194.4 million, or about $25 million.

On 29 July 2021, GBG USA commences voluntary Chapter 11 proceedings and is putting its apparel and footwear brands up for sale with help from a $16 million bankruptcy loan. It owes Kenneth Cole some $6 million in unsecured trade debt, roughly $3.6 million to ABG, $2 million to Sequential Brands and $860,000 Marquee Brands. The company has a $17.3 million stalking horse bid for its Aquatalia brand and is also looking to sell "a substantial portion of its remaining assets" in bankruptcy, including Ely & Walker, Airband, MagnaReady, Yarrow, B New York and Juniper unltd. The bankruptcy comes after the company sold off assets and inventory related to the Frye and Spyder brands. The brands' owner, Authentic Brands, recently reassigned those licenses to new operating partners.

Management
 William Fung (Chairman)

References 

Companies listed on the Hong Kong Stock Exchange
Multinational companies headquartered in Hong Kong
Li & Fung
Companies that filed for Chapter 11 bankruptcy in 2021